Intercités de Nuit is a brand name used by France’s national railway company, SNCF, to denote overnight passenger rail services in France. It was known as Corail Lunéa before 2009 and as Lunéa from 2010 to 2012. 

Between 2013 and 2017, most services were cancelled due to budget cuts. Only four routes, from Paris to Briançon, Albi, Latour de Carol and Nice, were kept.

The brand has since been reintegrated into the main Intercités network.

Network in 2022
As of 2022, the Intercités de Nuit network consisted of the following lines:

Network in 2012

As of 2012, the former Lunéa network consisted of the following lines:

See also
 Intercités
SNCF

References

External links

Official website

SNCF brands
Named passenger rail services of France
Night trains